La Compañía may refer to:
La Compañía (Chile), a town in Chile
La Compañía (Mexico), a municipality in the Mexican state of Oaxaca